Mir Mohammad Ali (میر محمد علی) also known as Ali Meer (علی میر) is a Pakistani television comedian and impressionist who appears in the TV show Khabarnaak and Jashn-e-Cricket ( PSL special ) on the GEO News channel using humor and satire.He also appeared on 4 Man Show on Aaj TV back in 2005.

Career
In 2018, Mir Mohammad Ali was going to don 50 different appearances mimicking 12 different widely known personalities in one special TV show. Geo TV's Khabarnaak comedy show makes fun of prominent political personalities including Nawaz Sharif, Imran Khan, Asif Ali Zardari, Rehman Malik and many others. This comedy show has earned a name for itself by creating awareness among the Pakistani people about many social and political issues by using satire and comedy. Mir Mohammad Ali plays the central character and is widely considered the main highlight of this show.

Awards and recognition
 Pride of Performance Award by the President of Pakistan in 2015.

References

Living people
Year of birth missing (living people)
Pakistani male television actors
Pakistani male comedians
Pahari Pothwari people
Pakistani humorists
Pakistani male voice actors
Pakistani people of Kashmiri descent
Pakistani entertainers
Pakistani impressionists (entertainers)
Recipients of the Pride of Performance